Pena Verde is a freguesia ("civil parish") in Aguiar da Beira Municipality, Guarda District, Portugal. The population in 2011 was 232, in an area of 15.88 km2.

Demography

References 

Freguesias of Aguiar da Beira